Frederica of Hanover (Friederike Luise; ; 18 April 1917 – 6 February 1981) was Queen of Greece from 1 April 1947 until 6 March 1964 as the wife of King Paul.

Early life
Born Her Royal Highness Friederike, Princess of Hanover, Princess of Great Britain and Ireland, and Princess of Brunswick-Lüneburg on 18 April 1917 in Blankenburg am Harz, in the German Duchy of Brunswick, she was the only daughter and third child of Ernest Augustus, then reigning Duke of Brunswick, and his wife Princess Viktoria Luise of Prussia, herself the only daughter of the German Emperor Wilhelm II. Both her father and maternal grandfather abdicated their thrones in November 1918 following Germany's defeat in World War I, while her paternal grandfather had been stripped of his British royal dukedom the previous year.

In 1934, Adolf Hitler, in his ambition to link the British and German royal houses, asked for Frederica's parents to arrange for the marriage of their seventeen-year-old daughter to the Prince of Wales. In her memoirs, Frederica's mother described that she and her husband were "shattered" and such a possibility "had never entered our minds". Victoria Louise herself had once been considered as a potential bride for the very same person prior to her marriage. Moreover, the age difference was too great (the Prince of Wales was twenty-three years Frederica's senior), and her parents were unwilling to "put any such pressure" on their daughter.

To her family, she was known as Freddie.

Marriage
Prince Paul of Greece proposed to her during the summer of 1936, while he was in Berlin attending the 1936 Summer Olympics. Paul was a son of King Constantine I and Frederica's great aunt Sophia. Accordingly, they were maternal first cousins once removed. They were also paternal second cousins as great-grandchildren of Christian IX of Denmark. Their engagement was announced officially on 28 September 1937, and Britain's King George VI gave his consent pursuant to the Royal Marriages Act 1772 on 26 December 1937. They married in Athens on 9 January 1938. Frederica became Hereditary Princess of Greece, her husband being heir presumptive to his childless elder brother, King George II.

During the early part of their marriage, they resided at a villa in Psychiko in the suburbs of Athens. Ten months after their marriage, their first child, the future Queen Sofia of Spain, was born on 2 November 1938. On 2 June 1940, Frederica gave birth to the future King Constantine II.

War and exile
At the peak of World War II, in April 1941, the Greek Royal Family was evacuated to Crete in a Sunderland flying boat. Shortly afterwards, the German forces attacked Crete. Frederica and her family were evacuated again, setting up a government-in-exile office in London.

In exile, King George II and the rest of the Greek Royal Family settled in South Africa.  Here Frederica's last child, Princess Irene, was born on 11 May 1942. The South African leader, General Jan Smuts, served as her godfather. The family eventually settled in Egypt in February 1944.

After the war, the 1946 Greek referendum restored King George to the throne.  The Hereditary Prince and Princess returned to their villa in Psychiko.

Queen consort
On 1 April 1947, George II died and Frederica's husband ascended the throne as Paul I, with Frederica as queen consort. A Communist insurgency in Northern Greece led to the Greek Civil War. The King and Queen toured Northern Greece under tight security to appeal for loyalty in the summer of 1947.

Queen Frederica was constantly attacked for her German ancestry. Left-wing politicians in Greece repeatedly used the fact that the Kaiser was her grandfather, and that she had brothers who were members of the SS, as propaganda against her. She was also criticized variously as "very Prussian" and "was a Nazi". When she was in London representing her sick husband at the wedding of his first cousin Prince Philip of Greece and Denmark to King George VI's elder daughter Princess Elizabeth in November 1947, Winston Churchill remarked on the Kaiser being her grandfather. Queen Frederica had replied acknowledging the fact, but reminding him that she was also descended from Queen Victoria, and that her father would be the British king if the country had operated under Salic Law (allowing only males to inherit the crown).

During the civil war, Queen Frederica set the Queen's Camps or Child Cities (translation of: Παιδο(υ)πόλεις / Paidopoleis or Paidupoleis) a network of 53 camps around Greece where she would rescue children of members of DSE and former partisans.

The Greek Civil War ended in August 1949.  The King and Queen took this opportunity to strengthen the monarchy, and paid official visits to Marshal Josip Broz Tito in Belgrade, Presidents Luigi Einaudi of Italy in Rome, Theodor Heuss of West Germany, and Bechara El Khoury of Lebanon, Emperor Haile Selassie I of Ethiopia, Chakravarthi Rajagopalachari of India, King George VI of the United Kingdom, and the United States as guest of President Dwight D. Eisenhower. However, at home in Greece and abroad in the United Kingdom, Queen Frederica was targeted by the opposition, because as a girl she had belonged to the Bund Deutscher Mädel (League of German Girls), a branch of the Hitler Youth group for young women; her supporters argued that evading membership in the group would be difficult under the existing political climate in Nazi Germany at the time.

Unlike her meek husband, in post-War Greece Frederika was one of the most hated public figures. This was due to a string of reasons that included her political interference, her intemperate character, her German ethnicity, and the fact she became identified in the public consciousness with all that was reactionary. Frederica has been described as "inherently undemocratic". She was notorious for her numerous arbitrary and unconstitutional interventions in Greek politics and clashes with democratically elected governments. She actively politicked against the election of Alexander Papagos. At home in Greece and abroad in the United Kingdom, she was targeted by the opposition. In 1963 while visiting London, rioting by Greek leftists demonstrating against the situation with the political prisoners of the Greek civil war, forced her to temporarily seek refuge in a stranger's house. Her political interference was harshly criticized and was a significant factor in the strengthening of republican sentiments.

Her 16 November 1953 appearance in Life as America's guest was taken on one of the many  state visits she paid around the world. Also that year she appeared on the cover of Time. On 14 May 1962 her eldest daughter Sofia married Prince Juan Carlos of Spain, (later King Juan Carlos I of Spain) in Athens.

Queen dowager
On 6 March 1964, King Paul died of cancer. When her son, King Constantine II, married Princess Anne-Marie of Denmark later that year on 18 September, Queen Frederica stepped back from the majority of her public duties in favor of her daughter-in-law. She remained a figure of controversy and was accused in the press of being the éminence grise behind the throne.

She retired to the countryside where she lived an almost reclusive life. However, she continued to attend Royal events that were family-oriented, such as the baptisms of her grandchildren in both Spain and Greece.

Exile
 King Constantine II's clashes with the democratically elected Prime Minister George Papandreou Sr. were blamed by critics for causing the destabilisation that led to a military coup on 21 April 1967 and the rise of the regime of the colonels.   Faced with a difficult situation, King Constantine initially collaborated with the military dictatorship,  swearing in their government under a royalist prime minister.  Later that year he attempted a counter-coup in an attempt to restore democracy, whose failure forced him into exile. Following this, the junta appointed a regent to carry out the tasks of the exiled monarch.

In 1971, Frederica published an autobiography, A Measure of Understanding.

On 1 June 1973 the junta abolished the Greek Monarchy without the consent of the Greek people and then attempted to legitimize its actions through a 1973 plebiscite that was widely suspected of being rigged. The new head-of-state became President of Greece George Papadopoulos.

The dictatorship ended on 24 July 1974 and the pre-junta constitutional monarchy was never restored. A plebiscite was held on 8 December 1974 in which Constantine (who was able to campaign only from outside the country) freely admitted past errors, and promised to support democracy. However, 69% of Greeks voted to make Greece a democratic republic.

Death
Frederica died on 6 February 1981 in exile in Madrid of heart failure, reportedly following eyelid surgery (blepharoplasty), although a biographer has claimed the surgery was cataract removal.

She was interred at Tatoi (the Royal family's palace and burial ground in Greece). Her son and his family were allowed to attend the service but had to leave immediately afterwards.

Honours

 Greece: Grand Cross of the Order of the Redeemer 
 Denmark: Knight of the Order of the Elephant
 Italy: Knight Grand Cross of the Order of Merit of the Italian Republic
 Thailand: Dame Grand Cordon with Chain of the Order of the Royal House of Chakri

References

External links

New York Times obituary
Μιχάλης Φύλλας,«Επιστολές Τρικαλινών στη βασίλισσα Φρειδερίκη «Στηρίζω εις σας μεγαλειοτάτη όλας μου τας ελπίδας…», Θεσσαλικό Ημερολόγιο, τομ. 77 (2020), σελ.282-286. 
Μιχάλης Φύλλας,«Επίκειται ο εξ ασιτείας θάνατός μου…». Όψεις της σαμιακής κοινωνίας στις αρχές της δεκαετίας του ’60», Απόπλους, τχ.83 (Άνοιξη 2020), σελ.330-336 

1917 births
1981 deaths
20th-century Greek people
20th-century Greek women
People from Blankenburg (Harz)
People from the Duchy of Brunswick
Greek queens consort
House of Hanover
House of Glücksburg (Greece)
British princesses
Hanoverian princesses
Queen mothers
Greek exiles
Grand Crosses Special Class of the Order of Merit of the Federal Republic of Germany
Grand Crosses of the Order of Beneficence (Greece)
Knights Grand Cross of the Order of Merit of the Italian Republic
Burials at Tatoi Palace Royal Cemetery
Recipients of the Benemerenti medal
Daughters of monarchs